The 1962 World Fencing Championships were held in Buenos Aires, Argentina in July 1962.

Medal table

Medal summary

Men's events

Women's events

References

FIE Results

World Fencing Championships
F
Sports competitions in Buenos Aires
World Fencing Championships
1960s in Buenos Aires
World Fencing Championships
World Fencing Championships